Harry Thompson (1960–2005) was a British comedy producer.

Harry Thompson may also refer to:

Harry Thompson (footballer, born 1915) (1915–2000), English footballer
Harry Thompson (baseball) (1889–1951), baseball pitcher
Harry Thompson (radical lawyer) (1885–1947), English solicitor and activist
Harry Thompson (spy) (1909–1960), former United States Navy yeoman who spied for Japan
Harry Thompson (American football) (1926–2003), American football player
Harry Thompson (rugby league), Australian rugby league footballer of the 1930s
Harry Thompson (Australian footballer) (1871–1957), Australian rules footballer
Harry Thompson (Hollyoaks), a fictional character in soap opera Hollyoaks
Harry Ives Thompson (1840–1906), American painter
Harry Langhorne Thompson (1857–1902), British colonial administrator in Cyprus and the West Indies
Harry Arnall-Thompson (1864–1916), English cricketer

See also
Harry Thomson (disambiguation)
Henry Thompson (disambiguation)
Harold Thompson (disambiguation)